Raymond Swan (born 7 December 1938) is a Bermudian long-distance runner. He competed in the marathon at the 1976 Summer Olympics.

References

1938 births
Living people
Athletes (track and field) at the 1976 Summer Olympics
Bermudian male long-distance runners
Bermudian male marathon runners
Olympic athletes of Bermuda
Athletes (track and field) at the 1978 Commonwealth Games
Athletes (track and field) at the 1979 Pan American Games
Commonwealth Games competitors for Bermuda
World Athletics Championships athletes for Bermuda
Place of birth missing (living people)
Pan American Games competitors for Bermuda